Connor: Spotlight is a comic book series based on the Angel television series starring the eponymous Connor, with cameo appearances by Angel.  It is the first comic book in which Connor has appeared, and features covers by artists Bob Gill, David Messina, Steph Stamb and Russell Walks. This title, along with the others in IDW Publishing's Spotlight series, was collected in the Angel: Spotlight trade paperback.

Story description

Summary
As Connor tries to work on a genealogy project as part of one of his college courses, his town is experiencing a widespread surge in vigilantism, in which suspected criminals are being killed. Connor suspects that he might be to blame, fearing that he may be killing these criminals in his sleep.

Expanded overview
Connor wakes up in his dorm room to a ringing cell phone. It's his father, Sean Reilly - Connor had called earlier to ask about his family history for a paper he is writing. Connor walks across campus while talking to his dad, but hangs up when he stumbles across a crime scene. He asks a police officer what happened, and the officer replies that a body has been discovered. The officer is immediately reprimanded by a nearby detective for discussing this particular case with anyone publicly.

Later, Connor's roommate Avery catches up with him. Connor asks Avery if he had seen Connor leave their room at all the previous night, but Avery replies that he wasn't there. As they talk, they bump into a group of frat boys. One of the fraternity brothers orders one of the frat's new pledges to hit Avery as punishment for bumping into him. Connor insults the frat boys, and the brothers orders the pledge to hit him instead. Connor picks up the frat boy and throws him, causing the rest of the group to flee.

In their dorm room, Connor explains to Avery that his real parents were vampires; that he was raised in a hell dimension by an enemy of Angel, his real father; and that Angel had arranged this "second life" for Connor with the Reillys. Connor says that having both his real memories of Angel and the false memories of life with the Reillys is disorienting, and he is beginning to feel "schizophrenic." When he had attacked the frat boy, Connor had slipped into the role of "The Destroyer," the boy that grew up in Quor-Toth.

That night, Connor falls asleep at his desk while working on his paper. When he wakes up, a radio newscast is announcing that another body was found on campus, and that each victim so far had been arrested for a violent crime, but released due to a technicality. Connor looks down at his paper and sees that he has scribbled "ANGEL" across his notes on Sean Reilly.

While playing basketball, Connor tells Avery he is concerned that he's somehow responsible for the killings. Avery suggests that Connor try to find the real culprit, and Connor agrees before dunking the basketball. In their room, the boys compare notes on their research. They have each come to the same conclusion: each victim had had a Detective Cavanaugh involved with their case.

Connor watches Cavanaugh - the same detective who had earlier reprimanded the police officer - to an apartment block. Hearing sounds of a struggle, Connor rushes in to find a bloodied man in the corner, and the police officer from the day before fighting Cavanaugh. The officer tells Connor to leave, but Cavanaugh yells at him to get help. The officer, named Durant, says that he had discovered Cavanaugh beating the man, but Cavanaugh claims that Durant was a suspect all along, and that he had come to give Durant a chance to turn himself in. Finally, the man in the corner speaks up and says Durant is lying - Cavanaugh was trying to help him.

Durant punches Connor in the face with enough force to knock him into a washing machine, denting it considerably. He throws Connor through a window, stating that he had acquired a strength-enhancing elixir. With a wild look in his eye, Connor attacks Durant, eventually knocking him unconscious with a car door. Connor says to Durant that he understands his outrage at criminals who escape justice, but that "you've got to learn how to suppress those primal urges...or they'll destroy you."

On the phone, Sean Reilly asks Connor how the paper turned out. As he speaks, Connor is standing on the roof of a building, watching Angel fight three vampires. He responds that he had seen himself in a new light, and says that he is sure of one thing, "I am my father's son."

Writing and artwork
Unlike most of the other Spotlight issues from IDW, Connor's book has a title: "Inheritance".
Avery says he is from L.A., and that two of his cousins ran with a gang of vampire hunters. This is likely a reference to Charles Gunn's gang.
Durant boasts that the elixir that grants him his strength comes a river that flows through the crater where the Sunnydale Hellmouth once was.

Cultural references
Happy Days: When Cavanaugh reprimands Durant, he refers to Connor as "Richie Cunningham," a character from the television series Happy Days.
The Six Million Dollar Man: When describing Connor's attack on the frat boy, Avery references The Six Million Dollar Man.
The Incredible Hulk: Avery describes Connor's plan to chain himself up at night as "a little too Bill Bixby." Bixby played David Banner, a character who lived in fear of his transformation into a savage creature, on The Incredible Hulk.
Pearl Jam: There is a poster for "Pearl Clam" in Connor and Avery's room.
The Texas Chainsaw Massacre: There is a poster for "The Breakfast Chainsaw Massacre in Connor and Avery's room.
Def Leppard: There is a poster for "Fed Leppard" in Connor and Avery's room, with artwork that is reminiscent of the band's album Hysteria.

Continuity

Canonical issues

Angel comics such as this one are not usually considered by fans as canonical. Some fans consider them stories from the imaginations of authors and artists, while other fans consider them as taking place in an alternative fictional reality. However unlike fan fiction, overviews summarising their story, written early in the writing process, were 'approved' by both Fox and Joss Whedon (or his office), and the books were therefore later published as officially Buffy merchandise.

External links
idwpublishing.com - August Solicitations.

References

Angel (1999 TV series) comics